"The Crossing" is the thirty-eighth episode and the third episode of the third season (1988–89) of the television series The Twilight Zone. In this episode, a parish priest is consumed by guilt over his failure to save a woman from a car crash.

Plot
Parish Priest to St. Timothy's Church Father Mark Cassidy is raising funds to open a children's wing at a local hospital. Maggie, his housekeeper and cook, is concerned over his not eating or getting enough sleep. Moreover, he is haunted by visions of a red station wagon caught in a crash with a woman named Kelly trapped inside. Father Mark was also in the car but was thrown clear during the collision.

At the parish, Father Mark is visited by Monsignor Perrault. Not only was he concerned about the funds for children's wing, but Perrault also knows about Father Mark's visions. He feels Father Mark needs a vacation but he says he cannot leave until the fundraiser has reached its goal. His other duties, including religious education, also keep him busy.

The children's wing is fully funded and dedicated to Father Mark. Perrault says Father Mark is now free to take a vacation, and has been ordered by the bishop to do so. Perrault tells Mark that he has put St. Timothy's and the community back on its feet and it will stand on its own. Father Mark is unsure of what to do now that his mission is accomplished.

That night at the church Father Mark confesses to God that he believes he could have saved Kelly and failed to act out of cowardice, and that he does not believe he can be forgiven and wants only release from his pain. The next day, from his office Mark once again sees the station wagon with Kelly in the front passenger seat. He goes outside, enters the vehicle with Kelly, and drives away. The accident occurs. At the funeral for Father Mark, Kelly appears in black and puts a rose on his coffin. She smiles and walks off.

External links
 

1988 American television episodes
The Twilight Zone (1985 TV series season 3) episodes
Television episodes about ghosts
Fiction set in 1988

fr:Le Prix de la culpabilité